This is a list of NSE-indexed conglomerates with corporate offices in Tamil Nadu. Quarterly top-line (income) figures are given in millions of United States dollars (exchanged at 45). Green indicates double-digit quarterly growth.

References

Conglomerates
Tamil Nadu
Conglomerates